Mundus Subterraneus is the third studio album by Lightwave, released in November 1995 by Fathom Records.

Track listing

Personnel 
Adapted from the Mundus Subterraneus liner notes.

Lightwave
 Christoph Harbonnier – electronics, engineering
 Paul Haslinger – electronics, production, engineering, mixing
 Christian Wittman – electronics, Co-producer

Additional musicians
 Charlie Campagna – guitar, loops
 Jacques Derégnaucourt – electronics, violin, viola, voice
Production and additional personnel
 Stephen Hill – art direction

Release history

References

External links 

 

1995 albums
Lightwave (band) albums